Arequipa (Aymara and ) is a city in Peru and the capital of the eponymous province and department. It is the seat of the Constitutional Court of Peru and often dubbed the "legal capital of Peru". It is the second most populated city in Peru, after Lima, with an urban population of 1,008,290 inhabitants according to the 2017 national census.

Its metropolitan area integrates twenty-one districts, including the foundational central area, which it is the seat of the city government. The city had a nominal GDP of US$9,445 million, equivalent to US$10,277 per capita (US$18,610 per capita PPP) in 2015, making Arequipa the city with the second-highest economic activity in Peru.

Arequipa is also an important industrial and commercial center of Peru, and is considered as the second industrial city of the country. Within its industrial activity the manufactured products and the textile production of wool of camelids. The town maintains close commercial links with Chile, Bolivia, and Brazil and with the cities connected by the South trainway, as well as with the port of Matarani.

The city was founded on 15 August 1540, under the name of "Beautiful Villa of Our Lady of the Assumption" in the name of Marquis Francisco Pizarro. On 22 September 1541, the monarch Carlos V ordered that it should be called the "City of Arequipa". During the viceregal period, it acquired importance for its outstanding economic role, and is characterized by the fidelismo towards the Spanish Crown, which honored Arequipa with titles such as "Very Noble and Very Loyal". In the Republican history of Peru, the city has been the focus of popular, civic and democratic rebellions. It has also been the cradle of notable intellectual, political and religious figures. In the Republican era, it was awarded the title of "Heroic city of the free people of Arequipa".

Its historical center extends over an area of 332 hectares and has been declared a UNESCO World Heritage Site. Historical heritage and monumental that it houses and its diverse scenic and cultural spaces turn it into a host city of national and international tourism, in its historical center it highlights the religious architecture viceregal and republican product of mixture of Spanish and autochthonous characteristics, that constituted an own stylistic school called "Arequipeña School" whose influence arrived in Potosí (Bolivia).

Etymology 
A local tradition states that Sapa Inca Mayta Cápac received a petition from his subjects to reach the valley of the River Chili. They asked him for permission to stay in the region as they were impressed by the beauty of the landscape and the mild climate. The Inca answered "Ari qhipay" (Quechua: "Yes, stay"). However, another similar tale states that when the first Europeans arrived to the valley, they pointed at the ground and asked for the name of the land. The local chief, not understanding the question, assumed they were asking for permission to sit down and gave an affirmation, which sounded like "Arequipa".

Chroniclers Blas Valera and Inca Garcilaso de la Vega suggested that the name of the city came from an ancient Aymara phrase, "ari qquepan", supposedly meaning "trumpet sound", in reference to the sound produced from blowing into an empty conch-like seashell.

Another possible origin of the city's name comes from the Aymara phrase "qhipaya ari" or "Ari qipa" (from 'ari': acute, sharp or pointed; and 'qhipaya': behind), which translates to "behind the peak", referring to the nearby volcano, Misti.

History 

The early inhabitants of the modern-day Arequipa area were nomads who relied on fishing as well as hunting and gathering for survival. Later, pre-Inca cultures domesticated llamas and became sedentary with the rise of agriculture. Terraces used for crop irrigation were built on both sides of the Chili River valley. The Yarabaya and Chimbe tribes settled in the city's current location, and together with the Cabana and Collagua tribes they developed an agrarian economy in the valley.

When the Inca Mayta Cápac arrived in the valley of the Chili river, he didn't build cities. Instead, through the mitma policy, he forced the resettlement of his subjects to solidify control of existing territories, conduct intelligence duties, and strengthen border enclaves to control unconquered villages. A Hispanic version of the events, detailed by chronicler Garcilaso de la Vega, which has been described as historically inaccurate, suggests that around 1170 Huayna Capac stopped in the Chili River valley with his army, calling the area Ari qepay which means "Let's stay here." Lands were then distributed among 3,000 families who founded communities such as Yanahuara, Cayma, Tiabaya, Socabaya, and Characato, all of which are districts in Arequipa today. After their conquest of Chile the Incas resettled part of the population thousands of kilometres away in Aconcagua Valley.

On 15 August 1540, Spanish lieutenant Garcí Manuel de Carbajal named the cluster of Native American villages in the area "Villa de la Asunción de Nuestra Señora del Valle Hermoso de Arequipa". At the time of its foundation, Arequipa already had a city council because Carbajal also led relocation efforts for an existing coastal city named Villa Hermosa de Camana. The name was shortened to Villa Hermosa de Arequipa. Charles V of Germany and I of Spain gave the town a status of 'city' by Royal Decree on 22 September 1541. The relocation efforts were led by Garcí Manuel de Carbajal, who was selected as the political authority for the foundation of the new town. Among the first public works carried out in the city are the Main Church, the City Hall, the bridge on the Chili River and the monastery of Nuestra Señora de Gracia.

Since the Spanish founding of Arequipa, the mostly Spanish population retained heavy loyalty to the Spanish crown, a phenomenon called fidelismo. Among its most notable proponents were Francisco de Paula Quiroz, Mariano de Rivero, Nicolás Fernández, and José Miguel de Lastarria. In 1805, the Spanish Monarchy gave the city the title of Faithful by Royal Charter. Because of its distance from other Peruvian cities, Arequipa was not heavily influenced by libertarian movements In 1814, Mateo Pumacahua's pro-independence troops only briefly occupied Arequipa. The city would remain under Spanish control until the Battle of Ayacucho (1824), due to struggles for local political power.

Arequipa's strategic location at the crossroads of the colonial silver trade route and that of the post-independence wool trade route allowed the city to emerge as an administrative, commercial, and industrial hub. In the decade following Peru's 1821 declaration of independence from Spain, society in Arequipa and Peru at-large was in transition. Thus, Arequipa not only became the birthplace of notable political figures but also the site of key political movements that helped defend the legal and economic stability of the city; thus elevating Arequipa to a status second only to its rival city and the capital, Lima.

On 13 January 1835, President Luis José de Orbegoso moved his government from Lima to Arequipa by presidential decree. Meanwhile, in Lima, General Felipe Santiago Salaverry named himself Supreme Chief of the Republic, arguing that the country was leaderless as Orbegoso was outside the capital. Orbegoso then sought support from Bolivian president Andrés de Santa Cruz against the claims of Salaverry. On 4 February 1836, Salaverry's Army of Reunification won a battle at Uchumayo. However, three days later in Socabaya, Salaverry surrendered to Santa Cruz On 18 February 1836, Salaverry and his nine officers were shot in the main square of the city.

After expressing their rejection to the Peru–Bolivian Confederation, the Chilean government sent a military expedition that arrived in Arequipa on 12 October 1837. To avoid military conflict, negotiations led to a peace treaty signing in Paucarpata, a small town near Arequipa on 17 November 1837. In the following years, the city was the site of uprisings and successive military coups, which ended with the victory of forces led by Miguel de San Román against the army of Manuel Ignacio de Vivanco in the Battle of Paucarpata on 29 June 1857. Around this time, Arequipa gained prominence as a center of business and trade, focused in agricultural products and the production of wool, sometimes through exploitation of peasants.

On 31 August 1882, following the occupation of Lima during the War of the Pacific, President Lizardo Montero Flores arrived in Arequipa and declared it the capital of Peru. On 22 April 1883, Montero installed a National Congress which was located at Independence College, also counting military support from a local army and important financial support from quotas and taxes coming from the economic elite and the southern agricultural districts. However, on 25 October 1883, a popular uprising overthrew the government of President Montero, who managed to escape to La Paz. Four days later, with support from city authorities, Chilean troops occupied Arequipa until August 1884.

The Republican Era brought many improvements to the city's infrastructure and economy. The Southern Railroad built by Henry Meiggs connected Arequipa with the port city of Mollendo in 1871 and with Cuzco and Juliaca in 1876. In 1908, the first telegraph system in the Arequipa region connected Mollendo, Arequipa and Vitor. In 1914, the city built its first drinking water supply system as well as an aqueduct. In 1940, the city's international airport, Alfredo Rodriguez Ballon, was opened.

In 2000, the historic center of Arequipa was declared a World Heritage Site by UNESCO. However, on 23 June 2001, an 8.4-magnitude earthquake damaged several historical buildings.

City symbols 
On 22 December 1540, King Charles I of Spain elevated Arequipa to the rank of city by royal decree, awarding it a coat of arms on which a mythical animal carries a banner inscribed with Karlos V or Del Rey.

Historians debate the origin of the crimson flag of the city. By 1940, several historians, most notably Francisco Mostajo and Victor M. Barriga, confirmed the royal origin of the crimson color of the flag, contrary to a blue banner which historian Victor Benavente hypothesized to be the original. This matches the color that local sports organizations use. On 2 September 1940, Francisco Mostajo sent a letter to the Mayor of the City to explain his views regarding the color of the Banner of Arequipa, basing his claims on the 'Act of the Oath of King Carlos III " of 11 August 1788. On 23 September of the same year, Father Victor M. Barriga also published an important document in the Catholic newspaper El Deber that contains a description of the royal standard of Arequipa found in the "Act of 3 September 1789".

The city anthem is Fourth Centenary Anthem. Lyrics and music were composed by Emilio Pardo Valle and Aurelio Diaz Espinoza, who won a 1939 contest which the city council organize to dedicate a new anthem. Since then, the song has been sung at all important civic events held in the city.

Geography

Location 

The central part of the city is split by the Chili River from north to south; to the north and east of Arequipa are the Andes Mountains, while to the south and west are sub-ranges of the Andes. The valley of Arequipa strategically links the coastal and highland regions of southern Peru.

A series of volcanic cones dominates the city skyline -- Misti and the extinct volcanic groups Pichu Pichu and Chachani. The western slopes of the Andes feature thick, extensive layers of volcanic lava.

Climate 

The climate of the city is predominantly dry in winter, autumn and spring due to low atmospheric humidity and a level of precipitation corresponding to that of a desert climate (BWk, according to the Köppen climate classification). On average, Arequipa has 300 days of sunshine each year. Typically, temperatures neither exceed  nor drop below . The wet season lasts from December to March and is marked by the presence of clouds in the afternoon and low rainfall.

The average relative humidity is 46%, with an average high of 70% in the summer season and a minimum average of 27% during autumn, winter and spring, according to data from the Goyeneche Hospital weather station.

The mountainous topography surrounding the Chili River valley affects low-pressure fronts and local winds. These winds occur mainly in the early morning and the evening. Mountain breezes typically flow northeast, and valley breezes typically flow southwest. Wind velocity fluctuates between 1.5 m/s and 2.5 m/s.

Solar radiation 
Solar radiation in Arequipa ranges from 850 to 950 W/m 2 (watts per square meter), one of the highest levels of radiation in South America and the highest recorded in Peru. Arequipa's proximity to the Atacama Desert and pollution contribute to the higher levels of radiation.

Cityscape 

On 15 August 1540, the Spanish plan for Arequipa resembled a checkerboard made of fifty-six blocks, each one of "400 Castilian feet" (111.40 meters) per side. Each block consisted of four or eight land lots, which were distributed according to the status of the new owners. Over time, some religious institutions would occupy an entire block as did the Convent of Santa Catalina and the San Francisco Monastery.

Urban expansion occurred at the expense of the countryside, and this phenomenon has accelerated in recent decades. Arequipa expanded east of the historic center, and new avenues such as Parra Boulevard and Siglo Veinte Avenue were built to connect the historic center with newer neighborhoods, such as Vallecito (developed in the 1940s) or with already existing towns like Yanahuara, which were absorbed by the city's expansion. Shantytowns appeared in the districts of Miraflores, Barrio Obrero, and Jacinto Ibanez. A permanent marketplace was built in a vacant lot previously occupied by the San Camilo Monastery. The Goyeneche Hospital was built between 1905 and 1910. Two theaters (Municipal and Ateneo), a hotel (Hotel de Turistas), a public library and the campus of San Agustin University were other city developments of the early 20th century. Housing projects and new neighborhoods were also built, such as Cuarto Centenario and Selva Alegre.

In the late 1950s, the city rapidly grew, especially in peripheral areas. Around this time, industrial operations located in areas of Barrio del Solar and Barrio Obrero, near the city center, moved outwards to the industrial zone (Parque Industrial), causing the former industrial areas to become commercial zones. Some educational institutions, such as the National University of San Agustin, moved out of the city center to more spacious land lots in peripheral areas to accommodate their growing facilities. Residential zones also developed in peripheral suburbs, causing the main function of the city center to be a tourist and business district.

Administrative division 

Demographics 

According to the 2007 census, 70% of the Department of Arequipa's total population and 90% of its urban population lives in Arequipa city proper.

In an early census in 1796, Arequipa had a population of 37,241, of which 22,207 (59.6%) were Spaniards, 5,929 (15.9%) were Native Americans, 4,908 (13.2%) were mestizos, 2,487 (6.7%) were castizos, and 1,710 (4.6%) were Africans. Population growth accelerated from 1.1% growth between 1876 and 1917 to 3.3% growth between 1940 and 1960.

The city's population increased from 80,000 in 1940 to 158,000 in 1961. An earthquake in 1958 and a drought in the Altiplano caused a rise in migration, urbanization, and peripheral city growth (suburbs and shantytowns) that continues to this day. The rearrangement and improvement of urban space after the earthquakes also helped cause Arequipa's population to grow twofold in a decade. The population increased from 158,000 in 1961 to 309,000 in 1972 to almost 500,000 in 1983. Urban development of previously rural areas incorporated subsistence farming into the urban way of life.

Evolution of the population of Arequipa in the period between 1796 and 2017

Sources: Population Census 1804 (Gil de Toboada) Viceroyalty of Peru in 1812, Census of inhabitants of Peru (1876), Census of the City of Arequipa in 1917 INEI, INEI 2012 population estimate

Economy 
74.2% of the Department of Arequipa's GDP is generated by the city of Arequipa, according to studies by the National University of San Agustin. The Department of Arequipa's GDP is the second highest in Peru, after that of the Department of Lima. From 2003 to 2008, Arequipa was the "city with the greatest economic growth in Latin America" with a 66.1% increase in GDP per capita, according to a 2009 report of "America Economia".

According to a government survey, Arequipa has the largest "workforce" in Peru with 625,547 people, and an economically active population (PEA) which amounts to 376,764 people having an employment rate similar to the national average with an average monthly income of 928 soles. The main economic sectors for the economically active population are manufacturing (12.9%), trade (23%), and non-personal services (36.6%). The unemployment rate in the Arequipa metropolitan area is 8%, compared to only 5% unemployment in Arequipa city proper.

In Arequipa, tourism is a vital contributor to the local economy, as the city is the third most visited city in the country after Cusco and Lima. In 2010, Arequipa received a total of 1.395 million visitors according to the Ministry of Commerce and Tourism.

Since the 20th century, many factories tied to the primary sector, especially textiles and agriculture, have emerged. Arequipa's serves as an important commercial and industrial hub in the southern Andes in Peru, linking the coast to the mountains.

Large-scale mining also contributes to the city's economy; as is the case of Cerro Verde, a mining site established in 1976 near the Arequipa valley.

The city's industrial sector has the largest nationwide diversification and is the second most industrialized city of Peru. After two major earthquakes in 1958 and 1960, with the law of the "Rehabilitation and Development Board of Arequipa", an industrial complex was built with one of the first factories being the Yura cement factory (Cementos Yura).

This first industrial complex named Parque Industrial de Arequipa now has a great diversity of factories ranging from consumer-related industries (food and beverages) and construction (PVC, cement, and steel) to chemical and export products (textile companies). Among the most important companies are Alicorp SAA, Processed Foods SA, Laive, La Iberica, Manuel Muñoz Najar, Bin Pan SA, Consorcio Industrial Arequipa SA, Omniagro, Backus & Johnston, Corporación Aceros Arequipa, Francky and Ricky, Michell & Cia, and IncaTops. Moreover, the city's industrial sector has expanded and other industrial complexes have emerged such as Parque Industrial APIMA (developed for small businesses), Parque Industrial Rio Seco and industrial areas in the Alfonso Ugarte Ave, Uchumayo Road and the northern part of the city.

On 15 August 1959, the first television transmission in the city of Arequipa was broadcast at the Cultural Hall of the National University of San Agustin. Businessman Jack Dwyre conducted the broadcast through his new company Televisora Sur Peruana in partnership with San Agustin National University as Channel 2 (now TV UNSA). The aforementioned university became one of the first in South America to operate a public TV station from inside its campus. Since then, two other public television stations began to operate in Arequipa—Radio Television Continental (Channel 6) in 1962 and Compañía de Radiodifusión Arequipa (Channel 8) in 1987 (broadcasting as ATV Sur since 2012).

Among the newspapers that are printed in the city, El Pueblo is the oldest in Arequipa (published since 1 January 1905) and the second oldest in the country. Writers such as Percy Gibson and Alberto Hidalgo as well as politicians like Hector Cornejo Chavez, Mario Polar Ugarteche and Alfonso Montesinos started their careers working for this newspaper.

Education

Primary and secondary education 
In 2007, the city of Arequipa had 20,595 students at pre-schools or Kindergartens, 143,543 students at elementary schools and 219,305 at high schools. Among the oldest and most prestigious schools in the city are Independencia Americana School, San Francisco de Asis School, Don Bosco School, La Salle School and San Jose School.

Colegio Max Uhle is a German international school in Arequipa.

Higher education 

Arequipa has more than 15 universities, nine of them with headquarters in the city and one of them being public (Universidad Nacional San Agustin). The other six are local branches of private and public universities of Peru and Chile. In 2007, a total of 70,894 students were enrolled in universities and 56,087 students were enrolled in colleges or technical institutes.

Two institutions of higher education in Arequipa were founded more than a century ago. Seminario de San Jeronimo, a center of religious formation, has been in operation since 1622. While San Agustin National University (Universidad Nacional San Agustin) was founded on 11 November 1828 it can trace its origins back to the Academia Lauretana de Artes y Sciencias, a college founded in 1821.

The first private university established in the city was Universidad Catolica Santa Maria, and the establishment of this university was followed by Universidad Católica San Pablo and Universidad San Francisco. Additionally, important local branches from universities outside the region, such as Universidad Nacional Mayor de San Marcos, Universidad Tecnologica del Peru, Universidad Los Angeles de Chimbote and Universidad del Mar (Chile) among others, are located in the city.

Culture

Regionalism
Arequipa, unlike other big Peruvian cities with mestizo and indigenous features, has been labeled as a "Spanish island in an indigenous sea" and because of its status as a "natural oasis". Culture in Arequipa is marked by the regionalism of its inhabitants; in fact, unlike other regional sentiments within Peru, Arequipa's regionalism was connected to the fight against centralism. This proud regionalism, expressed in numerous insurrections or revolutions, has earned the city the nickname "Ciudad Caudillo" (Warlord City). As Peruvian historian Jorge Basadre argued, "Arequipa is a gun pointed at the heart of Lima", alluding to the rivalry between the two cities.

Language
An element of culture in Arequipa City is its Spanish dialect which incorporates a distinctive rhythmic way of speaking, which usually elongates the last vowel of the final word in each sentence. A distinctive feature of this dialect is the "voseo", that is, the use in Spanish language of the pronoun 'vos' to replace the use of 'tú' or 'usted' (all corresponding to the English 'you'). In Peru, the voseo is sometimes heard only in rural areas except in Arequipa, where that way of speaking is heard in both rural and urban areas. Another dialect from the city surroundings, called loncco, has been largely lost due to migration from other provinces and the standardization of Spanish language by the media. However, there are contests in schools which promote the writing of poems in the loncco dialect.

Literature
Literature in Arequipa has a long tradition and many of the city's writers have gained national and international recognition. During the Spanish colonial period, only the works of Lorenzo de Llamosas survived. In the nineteenth century, the poetry and fables of Mariano Melgar incorporated patriotic and romantic themes. Other notable writers of Arequipa in that century are Benito Bonifaz, Jorge Polar and María Nieves y Bustamante, among others. In the twentieth century, Mario Vargas Llosa is the most recognized of the Arequipan writers in Peru and abroad, winner of Nobel Prize in Literature in 2010, author of novels like The Green House (1966), Aunt Julia and the Scriptwriter (1977), among others. Other writers of the 20th century were the poets Percy Gibson, Cesar Rodriguez Atahualpa, and Oswaldo Reynoso.

Art and photography
Some of the most detailed photographic records of 19th- and 20th-century Peru are found in the works of the Vargas Brothers Art Studio. Open from 1912 to 1958, the studio captured more diversity of Peruvian culture than any other photography studio at the time. Most known for their nocturnals and portrait photography of women, their photographic archive, which is privately held by descendants of the studio's founders and brothers Carlos and Miguel Vargas, have been restored and digitized. Many international showings of their works, have brought recognition to the studio and the way of life their images have preserved.

Museums

A UNESCO World Heritage Site, Arequipa's rich history and art is showcased in its many museums. These include the Museum of the cathedral; the Museum of Contemporary Art (Museo de Arte Contemporáneo) which is devoted to painting and photography collections from 1900 onwards, especially works by Peruvian artists like Carlos Vargas, Martín Chambi, Fernando de Szyszlo, Venancio Shinki and many others; the Regional Museum of the Central Reserve Bank (Museo Regional del Banco Central de Reserva) which houses pre-Columbian and colonial art pieces, plus a collection of colonial and republican coins and banknotes; the Santa Maria University Museum of Archaeology and the Andean Sanctuaries Museum (Museo Santuarios Andinos), both belonging to Santa Maria Catholic University, have an important collection of archaeological pieces mainly from local pre-Columbian cultures (especially the latter, which houses Inca mummies); the San Agustin University Museum of Archaeology; the Municipal Museum of Arequipa; and others.

Research, academic and cultural institutions
Among the scientists who were born and/or conducted their research in Arequipa are Pedro Paulet, a pioneer scientist on rocket propulsion, as well as Mariano Eduardo de Rivero y Ustariz, a geologist and politician. One of the most important research facilities in the city was the Astronomical Observatory of Carmen Alto, which Harvard University operated from 1891 to 1927, when the university moved its astronomical operations to South Africa.

Cultural events and activities are mostly organized by the main universities of the city: San Agustin National University and Santa Maria Catholic University, and also by cultural organizations such as the Alliance Française, the Peruvian Center for German Culture and the Peruvian North American Cultural Center. Since the 1990s banking institutions showed great interest in promoting and managing cultural activities; while private companies joined this movement by sponsoring various projects.

Sport
Association football (or soccer) is the most popular sport in Arequipa, with a popular local team being FBC Melgar of the Peruvian First Division, winning its first national championship in 1981.

City rivals' FBC White Star's women's football department of the club won the national league in 2009.

Other teams in the city are Sportivo Huracán, FBC Aurora, FBC Piérola, Senati FBC, IDUNSA and the now-defunct Total Clean FBC.

The main stadiums in the city (also used for other events) are: Virgen de Chapi Stadium (property of San Agustin National University), Mariano Melgar Stadium, Los Palitos Stadium and Umacollo Stadium.

Music
Music is also an important part of cultural life in Arequipa. Since the last years of the Spanish colonial period, there were important academic composers like Mariano Melgar (who was best known as a poet), Pedro Jiménez Tirado April and Florentino Diaz, all of them placing Arequipa as one of the Peruvian cities with a renowned musical scene. The Symphonic Orchestra of Arequipa, created in 1939, contributes to keep classical and vernacular music as part of the city's culture. As in the rest of the country, in Arequipa, many traditional music styles like vals criollo (or Peruvian waltz), yaravi (or harawi) and huayno are still performed.

Cuisine
Regional cuisine shows a great diversity with as many as 194 typical dishes. The cuisine of the city mixes recipes from European and Andean cultures, because many dishes were created to satisfy the taste of the Spanish settlers in Arequipa. As a curiosity, many restaurants feature a special main course according to each day of the week: chaque on Mondays, chairo on Tuesdays, chochoca on Wednesdays, chupe colorado on Thursdays, chupe de viernes on Fridays, puchero or timpusca on Saturdays and caldo blanco or pebre de lomos on Sundays. Among the most popular local dishes are chupe de camarones (shrimp soup), ocopa arequipeña, rocoto relleno, cuy chactado (fried guinea pig), locro de pecho, etc.; while typical desserts are: queso helado (ice cream made of milk, cinnamon and coconut), buñuelos, dulces de convento and chocolates. Besides local wines and beers, two typical beverages are chicha de guinapo a dark type of corn grown only locally, and anisado (anise liqueur).

Government 
As the capital of the Arequipa Province, Arequipa is governed by the Provincial Municipality of Arequipa that has jurisdiction over the entire territory of the province. The district municipalities within the province also have jurisdiction over local matters. As the regional capital, the city is home to the Regional Government of Arequipa. It is also headquarters of several regional offices of the ministries that make up the Civil Government of Peru.

City administration 

The Provincial Municipality of Arequipa regulates important citywide, metropolitan and provincial issues such as urban planning, transport, municipal tax collection, management of road safety (jointly with the local police), the maintenance of public roads and urban greenery, etc. It is also responsible for the construction of municipal facilities such as sports centers, libraries and social service centers.

Constitutional Court 

The Constitutional Court is the highest authority regarding control and interpretation of the Constitution. It is autonomous and independent of other constitutional bodies. Subject only to the Constitution and the Organic Law, the court has seven judges elected by the Congress with the favorable vote of at least two-thirds of the legal number of members for a period of five years.

The city is the "Legal Capital of Peru" and "Official Headquarters of the Constitutional Court", as a result of a decentralizing project. Due to the military coup that occurred in Peru at the end of the 1960s, the initiative was abandoned. Then, it was retaken after the election of the Constituent Assembly in 1978. This time, the initiative did not succeed due to the high opposition, but later concluded that Arequipa would host the then "Constitutional Court", as stated in Article 304 º of the Constitution of Peru, 1979: "The Constitutional Court is based in the city of Arequipa ".

Later, by the Constitution of 1993, the "Constitutional Court" was created, which, according to its Charter, is based in Arequipa.

Sights and attractions

The Old Town 

In its 332 hectares has 5817 properties of which 500 are categorized as heritage properties, generally have been built in the nineteenth century, on the site of earlier colonial buildings destroyed by the earthquake of 1868. The houses, usually made in ashlar, are characterized by semi-circular arches and vaulted ceilings. Ashlar structures always have thick walls: 1 to 1.5 meters for rooms, 2 meters for churches. Through the use of lime mortar, the walls are shown homogeneous image that is reinforced with brick vaults or ashlar that are justified in the rarity of the wood.

In the city is a stylistic school called "School Arequipa" of crucial importance in the region and whose influence reached Potosi. This school is characterized by profuse decoration planiform textilográfica and the open spaces and the design and size of their covers, which differ in these aspects of Cuzco and Lima covers.

The architecture in the historic center is characterized by the prominence of ashlar, the use of which begins in the last third of the 16th century. This volcanic stone, white or pink exceptionally soft, lightweight, and weatherproof, emerged as a seismic structural solution. The ashlar was unable to take the early years, except for the covers of the main church and some houses. The original city was built with adobe, masonry, sticks and straw roofs or mud pie. Houses of this type were made until the nineteenth century and were common in the eighteenth century, some remain in the original district of San Lazaro. Later came the brick and tile houses with tile found in the Monastery of Santa Catalina. The cataclysm of 1582 settled these systems and raised the earthquake reconstruction. Then came the ashlar as prime structural solution.

Major earthquakes mark milestones in the formation of Arequipa architecture. Five significant periods are:

 Founding and village (1540–1582),
 Splendor of Baroque (1582–1784),
 Rococo and Neoclassical Reviews (1784–1868),
 Empiricism and modernizing
 Evocations neo colonial (1868–1960) and
 Contemporary.

Religious monuments 

In historical existence is accounted for 14 churches or temples, four chapels, five convents and 3 monasteries, among the monuments of this type include:
 Basilica Cathedral of Arequipa
It is the most important neoclassical ediicio Peru, product reconstruction started in 1844 and finished three years later and led by architect Lucas Poblete. Its interior is faced with trs ships with one of the side walls of the main square which fills a side façade is divided by Corinthian columns.
 Church of La Compañía 
It is the monument maximum Arequipeña School, is one of the most splendid creations of Peruvian Baroque and starting point of this school, in its façade has an inscription inscribed with the year 1698 which shows that the beginning of the eighteenth century this regional art had reached its peak, therein lies a more exaggerated baroque altar.
 Convent of Santa Catalina

Civil-public monuments 
There are 10 buildings that origin were engaged in civic purposes, such as Phoenix theaters. and the Municipal Theatre, the Goyeneche Hospital and the Hospital of Priests of St. Peter, bridges Bolognesi and Grau, the Instituto Chavez de la Rosa, Railway Station, Mercado San Camilo and the convento de Santa Catalina.

Military monuments 
The historic center of Arequipa lacked a wall as we had the city of Lima, they persist despite military monuments as Twentieth Century Prison and Penal Fundo El Fierro women.

Civil-domestic monuments 
Within the historic center there are 246 houses that are declared monument households. This type of construction is characterized by thick solid walls, with arches and domes similar to those built in the temples and religious monasteries giving the same robustness and monumentality to these constructions built from the seventeenth and eighteenth centuries and generally used for housing.

 Casa del Moral
 Goyeneche Palace
 Tristan del Pozo House
 Mint
 Casona Ugarte
 House Iriberry
 House Arrospide
 Casa del Alferez Flowers
 Casona del Corregidor Maldonado
 Casa del Corregidor April and Maldonado
 Casona Goyeneche
 House of Pastor
 Bronze Tambo
 Tambo of the Loggerhead
 Tambo de Ruelas

Suburbs 
 Cayma Villa,  from the centre of town. Place known for its taverns and where there is a beautiful seventeenth-century church. With a viewpoint which affords a beautiful view of Arequipa.
 The thermal baths of Yura, . Its waters come from inside the volcano Chachani. Also, near the city are the medicinal sources of Jesus and Socosani.
 Sabandía natural valley with most crystalline waters in the region. Here is the Sabandía mill was built and in operation since the eighteenth century.
Built on the river Socabaya, is a residence that belonged to different owners of historic renown in Peru but became especially known for being one of the family properties principales Goyeneche. This beautiful piece of architecture is now open to the public.

Parks and recreation 

Parks and squares cover 26 hectares of urban parks in and around the historic centre; among the most notable areas are:

 Plaza de Armas
 Plaza San Francisco
 Parque Grau
 Parque 28 de Febrero
 Plaza Melgar
 Parque Duhamel
 Plaza 15 de Agosto
 Plaza España
 Plaza Santa Teresa
 Plaza Independencia
 Parque San Lazaro
 Parque Selva Alegre
 Plaza San Antonio

There are 22 hectares of countryside within this historic area.

Other notable urban green areas in the city are:
Parque Ecològico Alto Selva Alegre. Located in the eastern part of the city, in Selva Alegre District, next to Chili River. The park and its surrounding areas occupy an area of 1008 hectares of which 460 hectares covering only the ecological park. A part of the park is located in the buffer zone of the National Reserve of Salinas Aguada Blanca.
Fundo Paraíso. Is part of Parque Selva Alegre and occupies an area of 67 hectares
Chilina Valley countryside. Has an area of 151 hectares
Chilpinilla Metropolitan Park. 14 hectares

Infrastructure

Healthcare 

As the administrative and economic capital of the Arequipa Region, the city has the largest number of both public and private healthcare centers which total 680 establishments. Public health institutions that are present in the city are:
 Social Security Hospitals
 Edmundo Escomel (level I hospital)
 Policlínico Metropolitano
 Yanahuara (level III hospital)
 Carlos Seguin National Hospital (level IV hospital)
 Complejo de Prestaciones Sociales
 Ministry of Health (MINSA)
 Honorio Delgado Regional Hospital
 Goyeneche Hospital
 National Institute of Neoplasic Diseases (INEN):
 Regional Institute of Neoplasic Diseases

Transport 

Arequipa's urban road network has a radiocentric structure with four main avenues: Avenida Ejército, Avenida Jesus, Avenida Alcides Carrion and Avenida Parra; which allow the movement of the population between the intermediate and peripheral areas and the downtown. These avenues are connected, in turn, by other avenues such as Avenida Venezuela, Avenida La Marina, Avenida Salaverry, Avenida Cáceres, among others, which almost form a ring around the downtown. Other avenues such as: Avenida Cayma, Avenida Goyeneche, and Avenida Dolores link the suburbs and nearby districts with downtown Arequipa. Interchanges such as the one at Avenida La Marina and another one at Avenida Caceres help to relieve urban traffic. A road of 40 km approximately, which goes through the district of Uchumayo, connects Arequipa to the Pan-American Highway and coastal cities; another road goes through the district of Yura, connecting Arequipa to other cities in the southern highlands like Puno and Cuzco.

Public transit in Arequipa is currently operated by small private companies. In 2014, a metro system was proposed by Peru's then-minister for transport José Gallardo.

Arequipa's only airport is Rodríguez Ballón International Airport, which is operated by a private consortium through a concession granted by the government since 2011.

The railway network system has been operating in Arequipa since 1871, and enables communication between the coast and the mountains and different levels of progress and expansion of population centers located in its path. The system consists of the lines Cusco-Puno-Arequipa and Arequipa-Mollendo. It is of great strategic importance in the multimodal communication system in the southern macro region, since it is the most effective and economical way to transport heavy loads over long distances.

Terrapuerto Internacional Arequipa is a bus terminal located in the district of Jacobo Hunter. There, several bus companies offer land travel routes to regional and national destinations within Peru and to international destinations such as La Paz, Santiago de Chile, Mendoza and Buenos Aires.

Notable people
 

Augusto Pérez Araníbar (1858–1948), physician and philanthropist
Patricia Salas O'Brien (born 1958), sociologist; Minister of Education

Twin towns – sister cities

Arequipa is twinned with:

 Charlotte, United States (1962)
 Maui County, United States (1994)
 Corrientes, Argentina (1973)
 Arica, Chile (1991)
 Iquique, Chile (2005)
 Guangzhou, China (2004)
 Ponta Grossa, Brazil (2005)
 Lins, Brazil (2007)
 El Tocuyo, Venezuela (2007)
 Biella, Italy (1985)
 Cochabamba, Bolivia (1990)
 Puebla, Mexico (2006)
 Morelia, Mexico (1991)
 Guanajuato, Mexico (2004)

See also 
 List of colonial buildings in Arequipa
 Arequipa Region
 Metropolitan areas of Peru
 Goyeneche Palace
 Tourism in Peru

References

Bibliography

External links 
 Essalud y sus beneficios que brinda
 Municipality of Arequipa
 Arequipa Region 

 General facts and travel information about Arequipa
 Travel Information about Arequipa
 Local government of Arequipa
 Peru Cultural Society – Arequipa

 
Tourism in Peru
Cities in Peru
Populated places in the Arequipa Region
Populated places established in 1540
1540 establishments in the Spanish Empire
Regional capital cities in Peru